The Kuandu Museum of Fine Arts (KdMoFA) is an art museum in Beitou District, Taipei, Taiwan. The museum is located at the Taipei National University of the Arts.

History
The museum was opened in 2007.

Architecture
The museum is located inside Taipei National University of the Arts. It is housed in a five-story building with total floor area of 2,380 m2.

Exhibitions
Kuandu Museum of Fine Arts often organizes exhibitions of international artists, including the exhibition "Di-stances", showing the works of the artists Yabuki Takako, Sato Masaharu, Stéphane Pichard, Oh You Kyeong, Manabe Koichi, Lee Sang Won, David Lasnier, Kang Hyun Wook, Ho Hsin-Yi  and Chou Yu-Cheng.

Transportation
The museum is accessible by bus from Guandu Station of Taipei Metro.

See also
 List of museums in Taiwan

References

External links
 

2007 establishments in Taiwan
Art museums established in 2007
Art museums and galleries in Taiwan
University museums in Taiwan
Museums in Taipei